Subang Regency (Sundanese script: , Latin: Kabupatén Subang) is a regency (kabupaten) in West Java province, Indonesia. The Regency is bordered by the Java Sea in the north, Indramayu Regency in the east, Sumedang Regency in the southeast, West Bandung Regency in the south, and Purwakarta Regency and Karawang Regency in the west. It has an area of 2,051.76 km2 and its population was 1,465,157 at the 2010 census and 1,595,320 at the 2020 census; the official estimate as at mid 2021 was 1,608,594. Its administrative seat is in the town of Subang.

Administrative districts
Subang Regency is divided into 30 districts (kecamatan), tabulated below with their areas and their populations at the 2010 census and 2020 census, together with the official estimates as at mid 2021. The table also includes the locations of the district administrative centres, the number of villages (rural desa and urban kelurahan) in each district, and its post code.

The 253 villages comprise 245 rural desa and 8 urban kelurahan - the latter being the 8 villages in Subang (town) District

Tourism 

Subang has a variety of artistic and cultural interest.

Attractions

In South Subang 
A number of resorts exist in the Subang area to the north of Bandung.  These include the following:

 Mount Tangkuban Perahu
 Sari Ater Hot Spring Resort
 Ciater Spa Resort
 Villa Cempaka Ciater
 Cijalu Waterfall
 Capolaga Adventure Camp
 Sari Bunihayu Art and Tradition Field Tourist 
 Ciater Highland Resort
 Lembah Gunung Kujang Fishing Tourism

In Central Subang 

 Ciheuleut Swimming Pool
 Planet Waterboom

Historical and Religious Tourism 
 Wisma Karya Building
 Masjid Agung Subang City
 Gedong Gede (en : Big Building)
 Kalijati Historic Building
The handover of the Republic of Indonesia from the Netherlands to Japan, before independence, 1942. These buildings are in Lanud Suryadharma, Kalijati District.

In North Subang 
 Blanakan Crocodile Breeding
 Patimban Beach
 Pondok Bali Beach
 Bintang Fantasy Swimming Pool

The Culinary 
 Nanas khas subang / Subang pineapple
 Kerupuk miskin purwadadi / Indonesian Crackers
 Sundanese foods

Toll Road Access

Patimban Deep Sea Port
Patimban Deep Sea Port is under construction seaport at Subang, West Java, as an upgrade from the existing small Patimban Port. It is located about 70 kilometers from the Karawang Industrial Estate and 145 kilometers from the city center of Jakarta, where many Japanese industrial firms, particularly automotive manufacturers operate. The project was initialized in 2017 and the first stage was operational in 2020, with the second stage being scheduled for completion by 2027.

References

External links
 Subang Government Website
 West Java Province 
 Kota Subang, The Heart of West Java